Ōhāriu, previously spelled Ohariu and then Ōhariu, is a New Zealand parliamentary electorate returning one Member of Parliament to the House of Representatives. It first existed from 1978 to 1993, and was recreated for the 2008 election. Through its existence Ohariu-Belmont was represented by Peter Dunne, leader of the United Future party. Dunne contested and won the recreated electorate in 2008. He announced on 21 August 2017, he would not be seeking re-election in the 2017 general election.

Population centres
The 1977 electoral redistribution was the most overtly political since the Representation Commission had been established through an amendment to the Representation Act in 1886, initiated by Muldoon's National Government. As part of the 1976 census, a large number of people failed to fill in an electoral re-registration card, and census staff had not been given the authority to insist on the card being completed. This had little practical effect for people on the general roll, but it transferred Māori to the general roll if the card was not handed in. Together with a northward shift of New Zealand's population, this resulted in five new electorates having to be created in the upper part of the North Island. The electoral redistribution was very disruptive, and 22 electorates were abolished, while 27 electorates were newly created (including Ohariu) or re-established.

The Ohariu electorate replaced the  electorate, but did not include any of Khandallah or Ngaio.

The new electorate contained the section of Wellington City between Crofton Downs and southern Tawa, including Ngaio, Khandallah, Johnsonville and Newlands. The rest of the electorate consisted of Lower Hutt's hill suburbs of Korokoro, Maungaraki and Normandale. Ōhariu was one of eleven electorate names to include a macron, for the first time. The name was later changed to include a second macron.

Both Ohariu-Belmont and Ōhāriu are young and wealthy; it has the largest number of 30- to 49-year-olds in the country, and the second highest number of families earning between $70,000 and $100,000 per year. 69% of its population is New Zealand European, 14% Asian and 8% Māori.

History
Despite Dunne having a 7,702 vote majority in Ohariu-Belmont at the 2005 election, United's performance was less impressive. In 2005 it won just 5.6% of the party vote (down from 13.0% in 2002) in an electorate dominated by the big two parties: National came out on top in the party vote with 43.1%, beating Labour by 3.6%, having been reduced to 24.4% three years earlier.

Historically Ohariu (without any macrons) was an electorate based around north and western Wellington, contested between 1978 and 1990. A substantial redrawing of Wellington's boundaries ahead of the last First Past the Post election in 1993 led to Ohariu being divided between Wellington-Karori and the new electorate of Onslow. Dunne, then a member of the Labour Party, was the MP for the old Ohariu between 1984 until its abolition, and won Onslow in 1993.

Members of Parliament
Key

List MPs
Members of Parliament elected from party lists in elections where that person also unsuccessfully contested the Ōhāriu electorate. Unless otherwise stated, all MPs terms began and ended at general elections.

Election results

2020 election

2017 election

2014 election

2011 election

Electorate (as at 26 November 2011): 46,740

2008 election

1990 election

1987 election

1984 election

1981 election

1978 election

Table footnotes

Notes

References

New Zealand electorates
Politics of the Wellington Region
1978 establishments in New Zealand
1993 disestablishments in New Zealand
2008 establishments in New Zealand